Ugo Humbert (born 26 June 1998) is a French professional tennis player. He has achieved a career-high ATP singles ranking of No. 25 on 21 June 2021. He also has a career-high ATP doubles ranking of No. 361 achieved on 14 October 2019.

Humbert has won three ATP titles, the first in January 2020, in Auckland, beating fellow Frenchman Benoit Paire in three sets. He won his second ATP title in Antwerp in October 2020, beating fellow Next Generation ATP Finals player Alex De Minaur in straight sets. He won his third title and first ATP 500 in June 2021 in Halle, beating world No. 7 Andrey Rublev in the final.

At the 2018 US Open, Humbert made his Grand Slam singles debut as a qualifier. He won his first main-draw match by defeating fellow qualifier Collin Altamirano. He then lost in the second round to Stan Wawrinka in four sets.

He won his first ATP 250 main-draw match on home soil at the 2018 Moselle Open, defeating Bernard Tomic in three sets.

At Wimbledon in 2019, Humbert reached the fourth round after defeating 16th seed Gaël Monfils and 19th seed Félix Auger-Aliassime, only to fall to eventual and defending champion, world No. 1 Novak Djokovic in straight sets.

Humbert holds seven Challenger titles and reached the final in three other Challenger events.

Early life
Humbert was born in Metz, the son of Eric and Anne, and has one sister, Léa. Both parents and sister are butchers and caterers and run a renowned store in Metz.

Career

Junior
When Humbert was 12, he made the difficult decision to take the train to Poitiers to train with the French Tennis Federation. He ended up moving to Poitiers and continued his training.  However, he suffered a string of injuries that prevented him from playing for a year and a half.

In 2015, he reached the Abierto Juvenil Mexicano doubles final with Geoffrey Blancaneaux. His career-high junior ranking is No. 18, achieved in January 2016.

2017: First Futures title
In September 2017, Humbert claimed his first Futures title in Bagnères-de-Bigorre where he had received a wild card. A week later, he was again awarded a wild card into the Moselle Open where he reached the second round but fell in three sets to Simone Bolelli.

In November, he achieved his first victory against a top 100 player by beating Thomas Fabbiano (No. 73) during Paris Masters first-round qualifying match.

2018: Grand Slam and ATP debut, Top 100 debut
After a disappointing first half of the season on the ATP Challenger Tour, Humbert experienced a breakthrough over the summer when he reached three Challenger finals in as many weeks. After losing the first two in Gatineau and Granby, Humbert captured his maiden Challenger title in Segovia. 
That run allowed him to qualify for the US Open qualifying tournament, where he won a spot in his first singles Grand Slam main draw. In the opening round, he defeated Collin Altamirano, a fellow qualifier, before losing in four sets to Stan Wawrinka.

In September, Humbert reached once again the final of a Challenger tournament in Cassis, falling to Enzo Couacaud. The next week, he received a wildcard into the 2018 Moselle Open, where in reached the second round by defeating Bernard Tomic before falling to Nikoloz Basilashvili.

At the beginning of October, Humbert claimed his second Challenger title in Ortisei against world No. 55 Pierre-Hugues Herbert, rising to a career-high of world No. 99.

2019: Wimbledon Fourth round

Humbert started the 2019 season at the Brisbane International. Getting past qualifying, he lost in the first round to Yasutaka Uchiyama. The following week, Humbert played at the ASB Classic in Auckland. He successfully qualified for the main draw. Once in the main draw, he drew lucky loser Pablo Cuevas, defeating him in straight sets for his first ATP match win of the year. He was defeated in the second round by Philipp Kohlschreiber. At the Australian Open, he fell in the first round to compatriot Jérémy Chardy in five thrilling sets. This match was the first match where a 10-point tiebreaker was used in the fifth set.

2020: First Two ATP titles, top 30 debut
Humbert started the year at the Canberra Challenger. As the top seed, he lost in the third round to 15th seed Denis Kudla. He reached his first ATP final at the ASB Classic, beating en route two top 20 players, Denis Shapovalov and John Isner. In the final, he beat his countryman, Benoît Paire, in three sets to win his first ATP tour title. At the Australian Open, he was defeated in the first round by Australian John Millman.

Seeded eighth at the Open Sud de France, Humbert was eliminated in the first round by Feliciano López. Seeded fourth at the New York Open, he made it to the quarterfinals where he was beaten by sixth seed Miomir Kecmanović. Seeded sixth at the Delray Beach Open, he reached the semifinals where lost to Yoshihito Nishioka. At first, he had put on a show, beating Nishioka in the first set 6-1. However, in the second set, after a near 2 hour rain delay, he lost 6–4, and then the third set 6–0. Competing in Acapulco, he won his first-round match when his opponent, sixth seed and defending champion, Nick Kyrgios, retired due to a left wrist injury. He was defeated in the second round by eventual finalist, Taylor Fritz. As the top seed at the Oracle Challenger Series in Indian Wells, he was upset in the second round by eventual finalist, Jack Sock. The ATP tour canceled all tournaments from March through July due to the Coronavirus pandemic.

When the ATP resumed tournament play in August, Humbert played at the Western & Southern Open. This was held in New York this year not in Cincinnati due to Covid. He was eliminated in the first round by 14th seed Grigor Dimitrov. At the US Open, he was beaten in the second round by sixth seed and 2019 semifinalist, Matteo Berrettini.

In Rome, Humbert beat seventh seed and Italian, Fabio Fognini, in the second round. He lost in the third round to 12th seed Denis Shapovalov. At the Hamburg European Open, he knocked out top seed and world no. 5, Daniil Medvedev, in the first round. This win was his first over a top 10 player. He was defeated in the quarterfinals by Casper Ruud. At the French Open, he was eliminated in the first round by lucky loser Marc Polmans.

At the St. Petersburg Open in Russia, Humbert was beaten in the second round by third seed and eventual champion, Andrey Rublev. He won his second ATP title in Antwerp, beating eighth seed, Alex de Minaur, in the final. He competed in his final tournament of the season at the Paris Masters. Humbert claimed his second top-10 win by defeating second seed, Stefanos Tsitsipas, in the second round. He lost in the quarterfinals to 10th seed Milos Raonic after having two match points. Following this run, he made his top 30 debut on 9 November 2020.

Humbert ended the year ranked 30.

2021: First ATP 500 title, top 25 debut, Injury and early end of season
Humbert began the 2021 season at the first edition of the Murray River Open. Seeded seventh, he lost in the second round to James Duckworth. Seeded 29th at the Australian Open, he was defeated in the second round by Australian, Nick Kyrgios, in a five-set thriller.

Seeded sixth at the Open Sud de France, Humbert reached the quarterfinals where he was eliminated by top seed and eventual finalist, Roberto Bautista Agut. In Rotterdam, he was beaten in the first round by qualifier Jérémy Chardy. Seeded fourth at the Open 13, he made it to the semifinals where he lost to compatriot Pierre-Hugues Herbert. Seeded 20th at the Miami Open, he was defeated in the third round by 12th seed Milos Raonic.

Starting his clay-court season at the Monte-Carlo Masters, Humbert was ousted from the tournament in the first round by John Millman. Seeded third at the Estoril Open, he reached the quarterfinals where he was beaten by eighth seed Alejandro Davidovich Fokina. At the Madrid Open, he lost in the first round to Aslan Karatsev. In Rome, he was defeated in the first round by Jannik Sinner. He was eliminated in the first round of the Lyon Open by Yoshihito Nishioka. Seeded 29th at the French Open, he lost in the first round by Ričardas Berankis.

Seeded sixth at the MercedesCup, his first grass-court tournament of the season, Humbert reached the quarterfinals where he lost to third seed and eventual finalist, Félix Auger-Aliassime. At the Halle Open, he won his first ATP 500 title by beating Sam Querrey, third seed Alexander Zverev, Sebastian Korda, Felix Auger-Aliassime, and fourth seed Andrey Rublev. As a result, he reached a career-high ATP ranking of No. 25 on 21 June 2021. Seeded seventh at the first edition of the Mallorca Championships, he withdrew from his second-round match against Sam Querrey due to food poisoning. Seeded 21st at Wimbledon, he was defeated in a first round thriller by Nick Kyrgios.

Representing France at the Summer Olympics, Humbert, the 14th seed, upset third seed, Stefanos Tsitsipas, in the third round. He was eliminated in the quarterfinals by 12th seed and eventual silver medalist, Karen Khachanov. In Toronto, he was beaten in the second round by third seed Tsitsipas. At the Western & Southern Open in Cincinnati, he lost in the first round to Frances Tiafoe. Seeded 23rd at the US Open, he was defeated in the first round by qualifier Peter Gojowczyk.

Seeded sixth at the Moselle Open, Humbert fell in the first round to Andy Murray. As the top seed at the Open d'Orléans, an ATP Challenger Tour event, he lost in the first round to compatriot Quentin Halys. On 1 November 2021, Humbert ended his season early due to injury, having withdrawn previously from Indian Wells, Antwerp and the Paris Masters.

Humbert ended the year ranked 35.

2022: ATP Cup, Wimbledon third round, 7th Challenger
Humbert started his 2022 season at the ATP Cup. France was in Group B alongside Russia, Italy, and Australia. In his debut, he stunned World No. 2, Daniil Medvedev of Russia, for the biggest win of his career and first career win over a Top 3 player. In his final two matches, he lost to Matteo Berrettini of Italy and Alex de Minaur of Australia. In the end, France ended fourth in Group B. Seeded 29th at the Australian Open, he was defeated in the first round by compatriot Richard Gasquet. Hours after his first-round exit, Humbert was told as he was exiting Australia that he had tested positive for COVID-19 and would need to isolate in the country.

Humbert returned to action on 2 February 2022 at the Open Sud de France in Montpellier. Seeded seventh, he lost in the first round to Richard Gasquet for the second time in two weeks. At the Rotterdam Open, he was eliminated in the first round by sixth seed and fellow leftie, Cameron Norrie. In March, Humbert competed at the Indian Wells Masters. He lost in round one to qualifier Holger Rune. At the Miami Open, he got his first win since January 2 by beating Aljaž Bedene in the first round. He lost in the second round to 29th seed Aslan Karatsev.

Starting his clay-court season at the Monte-Carlo Masters, Humbert lost in the first round to Pedro Martínez. In Barcelona, he was defeated in the second round by 10th seed and eventual semifinalist, Alex de Minaur, in three sets. At the Madrid Open, he fell in the final round of qualifying to Kwon Soon-woo. However, due to the withdrawal of Taylor Fritz due to a left foot injury, Humbert entered the main draw as a lucky loser. He lost in the first round to 14th seed Denis Shapovalov. At the Italian Open, he was defeated in the first round of qualifying by Brandon Nakashima. Playing his final tournament before the French Open at the Lyon Open, he lost in the second round to fourth seed de Minaur. This was his third straight loss to de Minaur. Ranked 46 at Roland Garros, he was beaten in the first round by Emil Ruusuvuori in five sets.

Humbert began his grass-court season at the BOSS Open in Stuttgart, Germany. Seeded eighth, he lost in the first round to compatriot Arthur Rinderknech. As the defending champion at the Halle Open, he was defeated in the second round by fifth seed and eventual champion, Hubert Hurkacz. Due to Humbert failing to defend the title in Halle, his ranking fell from 50 to out of the top 100 at No. 103.
In Eastbourne, he was ousted from the tournament in the first round by qualifier Thiago Monteiro. Ranked No. 112 at Wimbledon, Humbert started off by beating Tomás Martín Etcheverry in the first round in 5 sets. In the second round, he upset World No. 6 and 3rd seed, Casper Ruud, despite turning up to the match without any racquets. He lost in the third round to World No. 58, David Goffin, in four sets. He ended up his grass-court season playing in the 2022 Hall of Fame Open losing in the first round to Peter Gojowczyk. 

As a result of poor form, several early rounds losses and not being able to get points at Wimbledon, his ranking plummeted out of the top 150 to No. 157 on 18 July 2022.
In July and August, he reached three consecutive semifinals and a quarterfinal in Challengers and improved his ranking by close to 20 positions up to No. 138 on 29 August 2022. Following a first round exit at the US Open, in a tough five-setter loss against compatriot Bonzi, he won his seventh Challenger title at the 2022 Open de Rennes defeating wildcard Dominic Thiem and climbed close to 30 positions up to No. 110 on 19 September 2022. After a run to another Challenger semifinal at the 2022 Saint-Tropez Open, Humbert re-entered the top 100 on 17 October 2022.

He received a wildcard for the qualifying competition in his home tournament, the 2022 Rolex Paris Masters.

2023: Australian Open and Masters third rounds, back to top 100 
He reached the third of the 2023 Australian Open for the first time at this Major defeating compatriot Richard Gasquet and lucky loser Denis Kudla. As a result he moved 20 positions up back into the top 100.

At the 2023 BNP Paribas Open he reached the third round defeating Bernabe Zapata Miralles and 25th seed Denis Shapovalov.

Coaches
From late 2020 onwards to 2022, it was made clear the Humbert's main coach was Nicolas Copin, who coaches at the Allin Academy (tennis). He was also coached by Thierry Ascione, former top 100 tennis player from France. In the summer of 2022, it was revealed that Humbert had ended his coaching relationship with Copin, whether permanently or temporarily was not revealed. From then, Jeremy Chardy, also from France, who had been off the tour for a few months after revealing he (Chardy) had had a bad Covid-19 vaccine reaction, and was to be off the tour for more than a year, agreed to coach Humbert until that time. Humbert has continued his coaching relationship with Ascione.

Playing style
According to his former coach, Cédric Raynaud, Humbert is a true offensive player who likes to volley.

ATP career finals

Singles: 3 (3 titles)

Challenger and Futures finals

Singles: 17 (11–6)

Doubles: 6 (3–3)

Performance timelines

Singles
Current through the 2022 Wimbledon Championships.

Record against top 10 players
Humbert's record against players who have been ranked in the top 10, with those who are active in boldface. Only ATP Tour main draw matches are considered:

Wins over top-10 players
He has a  record against players who were, at the time the match was played, ranked in the top 10.

References

External links
 
 

1998 births
Living people
French male tennis players
Sportspeople from Metz
Olympic tennis players of France
Tennis players at the 2020 Summer Olympics